Engan may refer to:
 Engan languages, a group of languages of Papua New Guinea
 Engan, India, a village in Tamil Nadu, India
 Engan, Norway, a village in the municipality of Trøndelag
 Engan, a surname; notable people with the name include:
 Erling Engan (1910–1982), Norwegian politician
 Jonette Engan (born 1951), American politician
 Kjersti Engan (born 1971), Norwegian electrical engineer
 Toralf Engan (born 1936), Norwegian ski jumper